Koelnagar (Official name Koel Nagar) is a town in Rourkela, Sundargarh district of Odisha, India. Koelnagar comes under Rourkela municipality as Ward no 28 (A , D, E Block area) and Ward no 29 (B & C Block). As per 2011 Census of India Koelnagar has a popolation of 14,804 people.

References 

Draft-Class geography articles
Draft-Class Indian geography articles